Johny Pitts is an English television presenter, writer and photographer from Firth Park, Sheffield.

Biography
He is heritage (his father Richie was from Bed–Stuy, New York and was in the 1970s soul band The Fantastics, who had a top 10 hit in 1971 with "Something Old, Something New").  In 2015, Johny Pitts traced his roots in the 2015 BBC Radio 4 documentary Something Old, Something New, a programme written and presented by Pitts, which included an interview with his late father and saw Johny travelling to Bedford–Stuyvesant in Brooklyn and Sullivan's Island in South Carolina to trace his father's family. He holds US and UK passports and is a Fellow of the Royal Geographical Society.

Writing
Pitts has written for Blues & Soul magazine, Straight No Chaser and The Observer, and won the Decibel Penguin Prize for new writers, with his short story "Audience" appearing in the anthology The Map of Me published by Penguin Books. He studied poetry under Debjani Chatterjee and has performed solo and alongside renowned poets John Agard and Valerie Bloom at venues such as the Albany Theatre, the Jazz Café, the Big Chill Festival, Notting Hill Arts Club and the Soho Theatre.

His book Afropean: Notes from Black Europe won the 2020 Jhalak Prize, the 2020 Bread and Roses Award and the 2021 Leipzig Book Award for European Understanding. It is a written documentary of the lives and culture of black communities throughout Europe, exploring the histories of the black diaspora and questioning the challenges and inequalities that black communities still experience in European countries.

Music
He is a keen musician and member of the Bare Knuckle Soul collective, who have supported the likes of Omar, the Pharcyde, Plantlife and Alice Russell and garnered acclaim from Giles Peterson, Zane Lowe and Trevor Nelson, as well as appearing on the Norman Jay Good Times 7 compilation.

Television
In 2002 Pitts participated in the Channel 4 reality television series Eden.

He was previously presenter for Escape from Scorpion Island, Roar and All Over the Place, He also had stints on CD:UK hosting with Lauren Laverne and Myleene Klass and on Blue Peter and MTV.

In 2019, Pitts lent his voice to Cyril in HISTORY's podcast Letters of Love in WW2 – a series based on the real-life letters of a couple separated by the Second World War.

Photography
Pitts collaborated with the novelist Caryl Phillips and Art Angel on a photographic essay exploring immigration and the River Thames for the BBC/Arts Council's The Space, and founded the website www.afropean.com, which is part of the Guardian newspaper's "Africa Network", and the ENAR Foundation award-winning "Afropean Culture" page.

His photography has been featured on The New York Times Lens Blog and the front covers of the Journal of Postcolonial Writing and Harvard University's Transition Magazine. A limited-edition photo book was published by Cafe Royal Books.

Published works
 
 The Thames Path. Fotografien. Hrsg. Craig Atkinson. Stockport: Café Royal Books, 2015 (2012).
 Afropean: Notes from Black Europe. Allan Lane, 2019.
 German edition: Afropäisch : eine Reise durch das schwarze Europa. Übersetzung Helmut Dierlamm. Berlin : Suhrkamp, 2020
 Johny Pitts: Lost in the thick Sheffield fog: Johny Pitts' best photograph, autobiografisch, The Guardian, 18 November 2020.

References

External links
 Johny Pitts website
 

Living people
English television presenters
Writers from Sheffield
English people of Guyanese descent
English people of American descent
Year of birth missing (living people)